BB Phoenicis is a variable star in the constellation of Phoenix. It has an average visual apparent magnitude of 6.17, being visible to the naked eye with excellent viewing conditions. Its absolute magnitude is calculated at 0.6.

BB Phoenicis is a Delta Scuti variable, and shows stellar pulsations that cause brightness variations with an amplitude of 0.04 magnitudes. Its variability was discovered by accident in 1981, when the star was used as a comparison star for the eclipsing binary AG Phoenicis. Photometric and spectroscopic data have allowed the detection of at least 13 modes of radial and non-radial pulsations, the strongest one having a period of 0.174 days and an amplitude of 11.1 milli-magnitudes. Observations in different epochs show evidence that the pulsations modes vary in amplitude, which is common among Delta Scuti variables. Pulsation models indicate that the stellar rotation axis is inclined by 50–70° in relation to the line of sight.

This star is classified as an F-type giant with a spectral type of F0/2III. It appears to be expanding after depleting all the nuclear hydrogen and leaving the main sequence. BB Phoenicis has an estimated mass of 2.25 times the solar mass and a radius of 4.7 times the solar radius. It is radiating 55 times the Sun's luminosity from its photosphere at an effective temperature of 7,200 K.

References

Delta Scuti variables
Phoenix (constellation)
F-type giants
Durchmusterung objects
002724
002388
0119
Phoenicix, BB